Night of the Twisters is a young adult realistic fiction novel by Ivy Ruckman that was released in 1984 by publisher Harper & Row (now HarperCollins). The book is a semi-fictionalized account of the 1980 Grand Island tornado outbreak, which produced seven tornadoes (including three that rotated anti-cyclonically) in and around Grand Island, Nebraska, on the evening of June 3, 1980, killing five people and injuring 134. It is told from the point of view of its 12-year-old protagonist Danny Hatch, who – after his home and neighborhood are destroyed by one of the tornadoes – begins a search for his parents as the event takes place.

The book won six literary awards including the Golden Sower Award, the Iowa Children's Choice Award and the Sequoyah Children's Book Award and as well as an Outstanding Science Trade Books for Children recommendation by the National Science Teachers Association and Children's Book Council. A loosely adapted made-for-cable television film of the same name was released on February 14, 1996, airing on The Family Channel (now Freeform).

Plot
At 5:00 p.m. on the afternoon of June 3, 1980, three hours before the tornadic thunderstorm hits Hall County, Danny and his best friend Arthur Darlington – an inquisitive California native with six sisters – take a bike trip to the Mormon Island State Recreation Area to go on their first swim of the summer, where they discuss the art class taught by Danny's aunt, Goldie, where Arthur created a bull roarer as part of a Native American crafts project (and accidentally broke a light bulb in the basement with); while at Mormon Island, they run into Arthur's 14-year-old older sister Stacey – whom Danny is infatuated with – and 10-year-old younger sister Ronnie Vae, whom Arthur declines to give a ride home before the storm hits. On their way home, Danny and Arthur are foreshadowed with the oncoming storm, when they endure strong winds as they cut through the Fonner Park parking lot and Sand Crane Drive.

An hour later, Danny asks his mother Linda – who quit her job as a hairdresser to take care of her infant son Ryan after he was born – to see if Arthur can stay for dinner, while his father John plans to head out to his parents' farm in Phillips after dinner to fix his father's broken tractor. After dinner, Goldie arrives to borrow Linda's bowling ball to attend a bowling league night at Meves Bowl, as the boys are about to take a bike ride through their neighborhood, where they run into their elderly neighbor, Belle Smiley, whose hair Linda is supposed to style before a church bazaar that Friday – and visit the Darlington's house. When they return to the Hatch house, as Linda sews a birthday dress for Grandma Hatch, Arthur sits down to watch television, and as Danny looks for snacks, the show they turned to on KGIN (referred to in the book by its real-life brand name, "10/11," in reference to Lincoln parent station KOLN and its Grand Island-based satellite) is interrupted by a severe weather bulletin about a tornado and funnel cloud sightings north of Grand Island, in St. Paul and Dannebrog. Several minutes after Linda leaves to check on Mrs. Smiley after being unable to contact her by phone, and placing Danny and Arthur in charge of looking after Ryan, tornado sirens blare as a worried Danny tries to phone his grandmother to warn his grandparents and John of the oncoming tornado, only for the siren to abruptly cut off after Danny hangs up when the phone line cuts out.

Seconds after the sirens sound again, a worried Arthur rushes to tell Danny of a tornado alert that was just broadcast over the radio. Right then, a violent tornado hits their neighborhood, sending Danny and Arthur scrambling to get Ryan and take cover in the basement. As the twister starts to obliterate the Hatches' home, they ride out the storm in the shower of the basement's bathroom; they remain there for several more minutes after the tornado passes, as rain and hail hit them from above the gaping hole where the first floor of the house once stood, and as water from one of the severed underground pipes seeps in underneath them. After Danny and Arthur – who become fearful whether or not their families survived – escape from the basement of the leveled house (with Ryan in tow) through the collapsing floor beams with the help of Stacey (who arrived after the storm passed, searching for Arthur), and look in awe of the rubble that was once the Hatch family home, Stacey informs Arthur that the rest of their family is alive, although Ronnie Vae was sucked out of the Darlingtons' now-demolished home (as she, Stacey and Mrs. Darlington were unable to fit under the master bed with the other four female Darlington children, leaving the three having to resort to lying flat on the floor) and briefly knocked unconscious after landing into the bushes of their neighbors, the Winegars. After Dan spots the wreckage of Goldie's home and Linda's car in the next yard over, Stacey and Arthur spot Linda running toward them, later recalling how she and Mrs. Smiley took shelter as the tornado came at them.

As rescuers search for residents unaccounted for, Danny, Arthur and Stacey volunteer to search for Mrs. Smiley, who is trapped in her roofless house, to the reluctant allowance of Linda, who takes Ryan and boards a bus to a local shelter. The three go to rescue Belle from the basement, using her kitchen table to navigate to her amid the partially collapsed back stairs, after Dan and Arthur find her asleep on a sofa, which they use as a makeshift ladder to get her and themselves out the window with Stacey helping them from outside. While seeking information about his dad, Danny exhibits more worry when a firefighter informs him that tornadoes were reported near Phillips, where John and Danny's grandparents are. As Dan, Stacey and Arthur are transported by police car with other evacuees to the Kmart on South Locust Street (one of the few buildings that escaped damage from another tornado that had hit the business district minutes after the one that destroyed the Hatches' and Darlingtons' neighborhood struck), Danny struggles to find out what happened to the Hatch farm in Phillips, when he hears a message on the two-way radio that Meves Bowl was struck. Shortly after, the police car experiences a close call, when another tornado touches down near the car's location and cuts through their path; Officer Kelly – who begins to lose his vision after the car's windows shatter from the twister's violent outer winds, spraying his eyes with flying glass – then asks Dan to help him steer the car to the Grand Island Police Department headquarters, eventually letting Danny take over driving.

Later that night at the police station, Dan, Arthur and Stacey are moved to the women's room of the jail that is serving as an emergency shelter for some of the tornado victims, where at one point, they listen to stories from the other families who lost their homes in the first tornado; Arthur later ponders why Grand Island had to be hit, even wondering if playing with the bull roarer caused the tornadoes due to a Hopi legend that its roar brings about whirlwinds, leading Dan to wonder himself if the tornado was his punishment for his jealousy and resentment of Ryan. Struggling to sleep, Stacey helps Danny take his mind off his worry by quoting scripture, when the generator at the station suddenly goes out partway through the verse, knocking out power to the entire building. The next morning, Danny, Arthur and Stacey discuss walking to the Kmart and the local armory, when the jail matron, Mrs. Minetti, asks the policewoman on duty to take the kids there on her way to her house in Doniphan, when the group experiences the grayness and mugginess of the weather.

At the armory, Stacey and Arthur reunite with their relieved father, working in his office, who had been out searching for his two oldest children the previous night. Just before Minetti escorts Danny to the Kmart where Linda and Ryan are, Mr. Darlington informs Danny that he doesn't know the whereabouts of John or Goldie. With all streets barricaded either by bulldozers and various emergency vehicles or downed lines and water on the roadway, Mrs. Minetti offers to either take Danny to her house in Doniphan or back to the armory; Danny asks to walk the way to the Kmart on his own, and dodges all obstacles along the way once he departs. When he arrives, he finds out the store's parking lot has been turned into an emergency command post and all civilians taken to the store were evacuated during the night due to high water, being transported to other shelters.

Just as Dan makes a run for it back to his destroyed house to see if either of his parents went there, John – with Linda and Ryan in the passenger's seat – drives up behind in his pickup truck as Danny crosses Fonner Park, where the family is reunited. Danny finds out that the tornado that hit Phillips had missed the farm (although the crops in the farmland were flooded by the heavy rain accompanying the storm), and that John spent much of the overnight searching around Grand Island for the rest of the family after returning to town and the remnants of their home on Sand Crane Drive around 1:15 a.m., eventually finding Linda and Ryan at a Presbyterian church – where they and Mrs. Smiley were sleeping on a rug in the minister's study – three hours and 15 minutes later but unable to find Danny when at the police station. The Hatches later arrive at their home, staring at the tattered remains from inside the truck.

In the epilogue, Danny explains what happened in the year since the storm. The family temporarily stayed on the Hatch farm, along with Arthur, whose family members stayed elsewhere, with Stacey living with her friend Evelyn, while Ronnie Vae (who did not talk or speak for three days after being tossed into the bushes by the tornado) stayed with cousins in California, before the Hatches and Darlingtons moved into government-provided trailers that August. Goldie – who, after being rescued from the destroyed Meves Bowl, wound up being taken to Omaha by a truck driver, where she stayed in a hotel, before reuniting with the Hatches on the farm the following Friday by transport from a Red Cross volunteer – opted to move into an apartment closer to the center of Grand Island. People in and outside of town help bring food and supplies to Grand Island, including Mrs. Smiley, who – with the help of some Mennonites – served canned food to others in town.

By June 3, 1981, when the Hatches throw a party commemorating the first anniversary of the tornado in their newly rebuilt home, the family has adopted a new cat, Minerva II, to replace the one who disappeared (and presumably, died) during the tornado and Arthur's mother has given birth to a seventh child, a girl named Tempest June. Mrs. Smiley, meanwhile, died three months before the anniversary, while waiting for a doctor's appointment.

Background
Ivy Ruckman – a native of Hastings, Nebraska ( south of Grand Island) – based the book on the experiences of her first cousin, Florence Rozendal, following the Grand Island tornado outbreak, the common nickname from which serves as the book's title. The home on Bismark Road in Grand Island that was inhabited by Rozendal, her husband, Harley, and their three children – sons Mark and Ryan, and daughter Cindy – was destroyed by an F4 tornado that caused severe damage throughout the southern portion of the city during the early evening of June 3. (The Rozendahls later rebuilt a new home in the same location where the original once stood.) Ruckman learned of the tornado's impact on Grand Island during a radio news report that ran hours after the storm, and subsequently made multiple failed attempts to contact her cousin by phone, eventually discovering that Florence and her family had survived several days later, when – while visiting her cousin's mother in Hastings – a police officer notified them that she had made it through the storm; Ruckman talked to Rozendahl ten days after the tornado struck. In October 1981, Ruckman attempted to get Rozendahl to write an account of her experiences during the tornado for a piece in Reader's Digest, which paid $1,000 for first-person reports of major events.

After Rozendahl's account was rejected by the magazine, Ruckman chose to adapt the story into a book, noting that no children's books about tornadoes had existed at the time. When Ruckman began to research the events of the outbreak in May 1982, when preparing to write the book (at which time, most areas of the city that were destroyed by the tornadoes were already rebuilt), the Rozendal family recalled to her stories of how they survived the tornado and other personal accounts in its aftermath. The book incorporates events occurring to the Rozendahls in the book; among them, Florence – like Linda Hatch – had been sewing a dress at her kitchen table, as her children repeatedly asked if they were going to shelter in the basement as the weather worsened; as experienced by Danny and Arthur before the tornado hit the Hatch home, the Rozendahls heard sucking noises emanating from their sink and pipe drains, and sought cover from the tornado in their basement shower (where Danny, Arthur and Ryan sheltered within the Hatch family's home in the book). Florence's son Ryan, an infant at the time of the storm, also served as the namesake for the infant son of John and Linda in the book, while Kelly Buck, a deputy with the Hall County Sheriff's Department who had spotted the first of the seven tornadoes in northwest Grand Island and who died from an inoperable brain tumor two months before Ruckman sought to interview him, inspired the character of Officer Kelly.

As the book was based on the real-life events of the storm, Ruckman also incorporated references to cities and landmarks within Hall County and central Nebraska into the book (including points of interest within Grand Island such as Dodge Elementary School, Mormon Island State Park and the Fonner Park horse racetrack, as well as the nearby towns of Dannebrog, Phillips and St. Paul) as well as an Associated Press report on the storm that is included as the book's foreword; however, the neighborhood depicted as the one where Danny lived was partially fictionalized, although incorporating two real-life streets in the city, Sand Crane Drive and Fonda Way. Ruckman stated in a 1990 interview with the Grand Island Independent that writing Night of the Twisters gave her more of a respect at the power of severe weather, acknowledging, "I'm a lot more afraid of tornadoes than I used to be."

Film adaptation

Night of the Twisters is a 1996 American disaster film that was based on the book and directed by Timothy Bond. The film premiered on February 14, 1996 on The Family Channel (now Freeform). The movie version is a loose adaptation of Ruckman's novel, set in the fictional Nebraska town of Blainsworth, in which a teenaged aspiring artist Danny (Devon Sawa) deals with his father (John Schneider) – who is renamed Jack and established as his stepfather, whereas Danny's biological father died in a plane crash years prior – constantly pushing him into being an athlete.

As the film is structured as a coming-of-age story, most of the adaptation both follows portions of as well as differs from the book (among the differences, Danny's mother – who is renamed Laura (Lori Hallier) – works as a diner waitress, instead of as a hair dresser-turned-homemaker; the inclusion of characters such as storm chaser Bob Iverson (David Ferry) and a more prominent role of Danny's grandmother; as well as the absence of four of Arthur's younger siblings and the Hatch family cat, Minerva), with more of a focus on Danny's heroic efforts to try and reunite with his family. The movie also stars Amos Crawley as Arthur Darlington, Laura Bertram as Stacey Darlington and Alex and Thomas Lastewka as Ryan Hatch.

References

External links
 Night of the Twisters

1984 American novels
1980s novels
American young adult novels
American novels adapted into films
Novels set in Nebraska